Dàjiē (大街) may refer to the following locations in China:

 Dajie, Jiangchuan County, town in Yunnan
Townships
 Dajie Township, Weining County, in Weining Yi, Hui, and Miao Autonomous County, Guizhou
 Dajie Township, Daming County, Hebei
 Dajie Township, Jingdong County, in Jingdong Yi Autonomous County, Yunnan
 Dajie Township, Longyou County, in Longyou County, Zhejiang